Fantasia is a 2014 Chinese drama film directed by Wang Chao. It was selected to compete in the Un Certain Regard section at the 2014 Cannes Film Festival.

Cast
 Jian Renzi as Sister
 Hu Ruijie as Xiao Lin
 Su Su as Mother
 Zhang Xu as Father

Reception
In Film Business Asia, Derek Elley gave the film a rating of 5 out of 10, calling it an "average, uninventive indie".

References

External links
 

2014 films
2014 drama films
Chinese drama films
Chinese-language films
Films directed by Wang Chao